Phtheochroa farinosana is a species of moth of the family Tortricidae. It is found in southern Russia (Sarepta, Uralsk).

The wingspan is 17–20 mm. Adults have been recorded on wing in June and September.

References

Moths described in 1856
Phtheochroa